This article is about the particular significance of the year 1804 to Wales and its people.

Incumbents
Lord Lieutenant of Anglesey – Henry Paget 
Lord Lieutenant of Brecknockshire and Monmouthshire – Henry Somerset, 6th Duke of Beaufort
Lord Lieutenant of Caernarvonshire – Thomas Bulkeley, 7th Viscount Bulkeley
Lord Lieutenant of Cardiganshire – Thomas Johnes
Lord Lieutenant of Carmarthenshire – John Vaughan (until 19 January); George Rice, 3rd Baron Dynevor (from 21 April)  
Lord Lieutenant of Denbighshire – Sir Watkin Williams-Wynn, 5th Baronet    
Lord Lieutenant of Flintshire – Robert Grosvenor, 1st Marquess of Westminster 
Lord Lieutenant of Glamorgan – John Stuart, 1st Marquess of Bute 
Lord Lieutenant of Merionethshire - Sir Watkin Williams-Wynn, 5th Baronet
Lord Lieutenant of Montgomeryshire – vacant until 1804
Lord Lieutenant of Pembrokeshire – Richard Philipps, 1st Baron Milford
Lord Lieutenant of Radnorshire – Thomas Harley (until 1 December); George Rodney, 3rd Baron Rodney

Bishop of Bangor – William Cleaver
Bishop of Llandaff – Richard Watson
Bishop of St Asaph – Samuel Horsley 
Bishop of St Davids – Thomas Burgess

Events
 February 21 - The Cornishman Richard Trevithick's newly built "Penydarren" steam locomotive operates on the Merthyr Tramroad between the Penydarren Ironworks in Merthyr Tydfil and Abercynon, following several trials since February 13, the world's first locomotive to work on rails.  As a result of this achievement, Samuel Homfray wins a 1000 guineas wager with Richard Crawshay as to which of them could first build a steam locomotive for use in their works.  
March 7 - Inauguration of the British and Foreign Bible Society, largely at the instigation of Thomas Charles.
The Cambrian is the first newspaper published in Wales.

Arts and literature

New books
Edward Davies - Celtic Researches on the Origin, Traditions and Languages of the Ancient Britons
Richard Llwyd 
Gayton Wake, or Mary Dod
Poems, Tales, Odes, Sonnets, Translations from the British
Benjamin Heath Malkin - The Scenery, Antiquities, and Biography of South Wales
Azariah Shadrach - Drws i'r Meddwl Segur
Hester Thrale - British Synonymy: or an attempt at regulating the choice of words in familiar conversation

Music
Edward Jones - The Lyric Airs

Births
14 January - Sir Hugh Owen, educationist (died 1881)
20 January - John Jones (Idrisyn), clergyman and author (died 1887)
2 March - Henry Davies, journalist (died 1890) 
5 March - John Davies (Siôn Gymro), minister and linguist (died 1884)
31 March - Rice Rees, clergyman and historian (died 1839)
12 April (in Indiana) - George Wallace Jones, US senator and son of Welsh lawyer John Rice Jones (died 1896)
date unknown - Benjamin Price, first bishop of the "Free Church of England" (died 1896)

Deaths
19 January - John Vaughan, politician, about 51
19 March - Philip Yorke, politician and antiquary, 60
17 May - Mary Penry, Moravian settler in Pennsylvania, 68
20 September - Josiah Rees, Unitarian minister, 59
1 December - Thomas Harley, Lord Lieutenant of Radnorshire, 74
7 December - Morgan John Rhys, Baptist minister, 43

References

 
 Wales